is a passenger railway station located in the city of  Kamogawa, Chiba Prefecture, Japan operated by the East Japan Railway Company (JR East).

Lines

Station layout
The station consists of one island platform and one side platform serving three tracks, connected to the station building by a footbridge. The station is a Kan'i itaku station operated by the Kamogawa municipal authority, with point-of-sales terminal installed.

Platform

History
Amatsu-Kominato Station was opened on 15 April 1929. The station was absorbed into the JR East network upon the privatization of the Japan National Railways (JNR) on 1 April 1987.

Passenger statistics
In fiscal 2019, the station was used by an average of 172 passengers daily (boarding passengers only).

Surrounding area
 Kominato Elementary School

See also
 List of railway stations in Japan

References

External links

 JR East Station information  

Railway stations in Japan opened in 1929
Railway stations in Chiba Prefecture
Sotobō Line
Kamogawa, Chiba